Lovely Planet is a first-person shooter platform video game developed by Indian indie developer Quicktequila and published by tinyBuild. It was released for Microsoft Windows, OS X and Linux in July 2014, for Xbox One in January 2016, and the PlayStation 4 and Wii U in April 2016.

The game received mixed reviews from critics, with praise given its visuals and soundtrack, but criticism for its presentation and level of difficulty.

Gameplay 

The game is a speedrunning focused first-person shooter where the player must complete the level as fast as possible to progress. There is no plot, but rather "micro-levels" contained within larger areas. Being hit by a bullet, falling, or touching enemies causes the player to die instantly, and the player must memorize the levels to win.

The player's gun does not have an aiming reticle, and bullets move slowly, forcing the player to lead their shots. Players can earn up to 3 stars depending on how fast they beat a level, with the third star requiring perfect accuracy.

Certain level hazards also force the player forward, for example, apples that must be shot out of the sky or they will kill the player when they reach the ground.

Development 
The game's art style and music has been compared by several critics to Katamari Damacy. Andras Neltz of Kotaku found the dissonance between the game's graphics, music and shooting mechanics to be "unsettling".

Reception 
The game received mixed reception, according to review aggregator Metacritic.

Tyler Wilde of PC Gamer rated the game 82/100, calling the gameplay "great" despite being "merciless", but saying the presentation was "mediocre", as it was too "abstract" to be appealing.

Tim Latshaw of Nintendo Life rated the Wii U version 6/10, comparing the contrast between its "cute" graphics and "technical" mechanics "like opening a Hello Kitty backpack and finding nuclear launch codes within". He stated that while "dedicated speedrunners" would enjoy it, its appeal was otherwise "limited".

James Cunningham of Hardcore Gamer rated the game a 2/5, saying that the necessity for extremely precise gameplay "leech[ed] the joy out of the action".

Sequels 
Two sequels were created following the game's release, Lovely Planet Arcade, a more puzzle-oriented first-person shooter, which released on July 22, 2016, and Super Lovely Planet, a third-person platformer in which the player controls a bouncing ball without any attacks, which released on July 28, 2017. Another sequel, entitled Lovely Planet 2: April Skies, was released on June 18, 2019.

References 

2014 video games
Single-player video games
First-person shooters
Platform games
Indie video games
Windows games
MacOS games
Linux games
Xbox One games
Wii U eShop games
PlayStation Network games
PlayStation 4 games
TinyBuild games
Video games developed in India
Video games scored by Calum Bowen